Sir Thomas Cornwallis (1518/1519 – 1604) was an English politician.

Family
Thomas Cornwallis was the eldest son of Sir John Cornwallis (c. 1491–1544), steward of the household of the future King Edward VI during the years 1538–1544, by his wife, Mary Sulyard, daughter of Edward Sulyard of Otes, Essex.

Career
Cornwallis was appointed High Sheriff of Norfolk and Suffolk for 1552–53 and made a Privy Councillor in Aug. 1553. He was the last Treasurer of Calais from April 1554 to December 1557 and Comptroller of the Household from December 1557 to November 1558.

He was elected a Member (MP) of the Parliament of England for Suffolk in 1547 and 1558, for Gatton in October 1553 and Grampound in April 1554.

Marriage and issue
Cornwallis married, by 1540, Anne Jerningham, the daughter of Sir John Jerningham of Somerleyton, Suffolk, and Bridget Drury, the daughter of Sir Robert Drury of Hawstead, Suffolk, by whom he had two sons, Sir Charles Cornwallis and Sir William Cornwallis, and four daughters, including Elizabeth Cornwallis, the second wife of Sir Thomas Kitson (1540–1603), son and heir of Sir Thomas Kitson (died 1540).

Notes

References

External links
Cornwallis, Sir Charles (c.1555-1629), of Brome Hall and Beeston St. Andrews, Suffolk, and Harborne, Staffordshire, History of Parliament Retrieved 27 May 2013
Cornwallis, Sir William (c.1549-1611), of Brome Hall, Suffolk, and London, History of Parliament Retrieved 27 May 2013

1519 births
1604 deaths
Members of the pre-1707 English Parliament for constituencies in Cornwall
English MPs 1547–1552
English MPs 1553 (Mary I)
English MPs 1554
English MPs 1558
Cornwallis family